Huachuhuilca (Quechua wachu ridge between two furrows row, willka grandchild, great-grandson, lineage, sacred, divine or Anadenanthera colubrina (a tree))  is a  mountain in the Huanzo mountain range in the Andes of Peru. It is situated in the Arequipa Region, La Unión Province, Puyca District, southwest of Lake Ecma.

References 

Mountains of Arequipa Region